This  list of protected areas in Halsnæs Municipality lists protected areas in Halsnæs Municipality, Denmark.

List

See also

References

Halsnæs Municipality
Halsnaes